The Museum of Greek Folk Art is a museum in Athens, Greece. The museum was founded in 1918 as the Museum of Greek Handicrafts in the Tzistarakis Mosque in Monastiraki, which later became the National Museum of Decorative Arts and in 1959 it obtained its current name. In 1973 the greater part of the collection and the main functions of the museum were moved to 17 Kydathinaion Str. in Plaka and the mosque was annexed to it. Other annexes are the old "Public Baths" at Kyrristou 8 and one at Thespidos 8, both also in Plaka.

Tzistarakis Mosque

The Tzistarakis Mosque in Monastiraki square is one of the annexes of the Museum of Greek Folk Art, housing the "V. Kyriazopoulos Collection of Folk Pottery".

Public Baths

The old Public Baths in 8 Kyrristou Str. is the only surviving and very well preserved Public Baths building in Athens and it is another annex of the Folk Art Museum.

See also
 List of former mosques in Greece

External links

Hellenic Ministry of Culture and Tourism
City of Athens

Museums in Athens
Folk art museums and galleries in Greece
Art museums established in 1918
1918 establishments in Greece